Cephise is a Neotropical genus of skipper butterflies of the subfamily Eudaminae, within which it is placed in subtribe Cephisina.

Species
Per Li et al. 2019, the genus contains the following species:
Cephise aelius (Plötz, 1880) – Mexico, Guatemala, Honduras
Cephise burnsi  Austin & Mielke, 2000 – Brazil (Espírito Santo).
Cephise callias (Mabille, 1888)
Cephise cephise  (Herrich-Schäffer, 1869) – Brazil, Peru
Cephise glarus (Mabille, 1888) – Brazil (Pará)
Cephise guatemalaensis  (Freeman, 1977) – Guatemala, south Mexico
Cephise impunctus  Austin & Mielke, 2000 – Brazil (Rondônia) 
Cephise maculatus Austin & Mielke, 2000 – Brazil (Rondônia)
Cephise malesedis  Austin & Mielke, 2000 – Brazil (Rondônia)
Cephise mexicanus Austin & Mielke, 2000 – Mexico
Cephise nuspesez Burns, 1996 – Mexico, Costa Rica
Cephise procerus (Plötz, 1880) – Brazil (Pará), Mexico to  Venezuela

References

Natural History Museum Lepidoptera genus database

External links
images representing Cephise at Consortium for the Barcode of Life

Hesperiidae of South America
Eudaminae
Hesperiidae genera